Luis de Quixano y Font (c. 1810 - c. 1880) was Mayor of Ponce, Puerto Rico, from 11 July 1863 to 23 June 1865.

Background
Quixano Font was a retired Spanish colonel that performed as corregidor mayor of Ponce. He was also an early propeller of the celebration of the fiestas patronales in Ponce.

Mayoral term
Luis de Quixano y Font is best known for building the now-historic 65-kiosk Plaza del Mercado de Ponce in 1863. 
 Occupying a full city block, this farmers' market was modeled after the Paris farmers' market. Luis de Quixano is also credited with setting up the first lighting of the city, when he ordered the installation of 16 oil-based lampposts around Plaza Las Delicias in 1864. Upon leaving his mayoral duties in Ponce on 23 June 1865, Quixano y Font became mayor of San German.

See also

List of Puerto Ricans
List of mayors of Ponce, Puerto Rico

Notes

References

Further reading
 Ramon Marin. Las Fiestas Populares de Ponce. Editorial Universidad de Puerto Rico. 1994.

External links
 Guardia Civil española (c. 1898) (Includes military ranks in 1880s Spanish Empire.)

Mayors of Ponce, Puerto Rico
1810s births
1880s deaths
Year of birth uncertain
Year of death uncertain